A tea garden is a garden associated with the drinking of tea.

Tea garden may also refer to:
 Tea plantation, a place where tea bushes are cultivated
 Tea Gardens, New South Wales, a locality in NSW, Australia
 Teagarden, a surname

See also
 Japanese Tea Garden (disambiguation)